1947 in professional wrestling describes the year's events in the world of professional wrestling.

List of notable promotions 
Only one promotion held notable shows in 1947.

Calendar of notable shows

Championship changes

EMLL

Debuts
Debut date uncertain:
Adolfo Moreno
Chief Jay Strongbow
Eddie Graham
Dr. Jerry Graham
Johnny Valentine
October 9  Sky Low Low

Births
Date of birth uncertain:
B. J. Annis 
Butts Giraud 
Gilles Poisson
January 8  Ashura Hara(died in 2015) 
January 8  Luke Williams
January 26  Raúl Mata(died in 2019) 
February 9  Alexis Smirnoff (died in 2019)
February 23  Bobby Bass (wrestler)
March 6  Killer Khan
March 7  Chick Donovan 
March 19  Scott Casey
March 28  Tony St. Clair
April 2   Ron Pritchard 
April 26  Larry Matysik (died in 2018) 
May 1  Samson Kutsuwada (died in 2004) 
June 16  Buddy Roberts(died in 2012)
July 9   Tommy Young 
July 14  Ultramán
July 19  Frenchy Martin (died in 2016) 
July 23  El Halcón
August 28  El Cobarde(died in 1983) 
August 31  Animal Hamaguchi
September 15  Teddy Long
October 5  El Faraón
October 14  Nikolai Volkoff(died in 2018) 
October 22  Porkchop Cash 
October 30  George Wells 
December 4  Killer Tim Brooks (died in 2020) 
December 27  Bill Eadie

References

 
professional wrestling